Ján Mucha (born 5 December 1982) is a Slovak former professional footballer who played as a goalkeeper.

Club career

Everton
In January 2010, Mucha signed a pre-contract deal with English Premier League club Everton to join them on 1 July.
On 4 August 2010, Mucha made his Everton debut playing the first 45 minutes of a pre-season friendly against Chilean side Everton de Viña del Mar at Goodison Park, before being replaced in goal by Iain Turner at half-time. His competitive debut for Everton came in the first match of their League Cup campaign, a 5–1 win over Huddersfield Town. He went on to play in the successive League Cup match against Brentford, in which he saved a penalty kick in the second half, but could not keep his side in the competition in the penalty shootout to decide the match, which Everton lost 4–3. Mucha made his sixth appearance for the club and his first in the 2012/13 season in a League Cup tie at home to Leyton Orient in August 2012, which Everton won 5–0. Mucha played in the next round as Everton lost 2–1 away to Leeds United.

He was on the bench in all 38 Premier League fixtures of 2010–11 and 2011–12 seasons as an unused sub. On 2 March 2013, with regular keeper Tim Howard injured, Mucha finally made his league debut for Everton in a 3–1 home win against Reading. On 9 March 2013, with Howard still injured, Mucha made his FA Cup debut in a 3–0 home loss to Wigan. He made his 10th appearance for the club the following week in a home league game against Manchester City. Everton ran out 2–0 winners with Mucha producing a string of fine saves. Mucha left Everton when his contract expired at the end of the season.

Krylia Sovetov Samara
In July 2013, Mucha signed for Russian side Krylia Sovetov Samara.

On 15 January 2015, Mucha signed with Arsenal Tula on loan till the end of the 2014–15 season.

Slovan Bratislava
On 28 June 2015, Mucha signed a four-year contract with Slovak club ŠK Slovan Bratislava.

Bruk-Bet Termalica Nieciecza
On 29 June 2017, Mucha joined Ekstraklasa side Bruk-Bet Termalica Nieciecza.

Hamilton Academical
In November 2018, Mucha signed a short-term deal with Scottish club Hamilton Academical. The contract expired on 1 January 2019 and he left the club.

International career
Mucha made his debut for Slovakia in February 2008, in a friendly match against Hungary, and became the national team's first-choice goalkeeper. When Slovakia qualified for the FIFA World Cup for the first time, in 2010, Mucha played in all four games as Slovakia made it to the second round of the competition. Later he was selected for Euro 2016.

Personal life
In March 2013, Mucha was ordered to do 250 hours of community service after being caught driving with a suspended license.

References

External links
 
 
 
 
 
 

1982 births
Living people
People from Snina District
Sportspeople from the Prešov Region
Slovak footballers
Association football goalkeepers
Slovakia international footballers
Olympic footballers of Slovakia
Footballers at the 2000 Summer Olympics
2010 FIFA World Cup players
UEFA Euro 2016 players
Slovak Super Liga players
Ekstraklasa players
Premier League players
Russian Premier League players
Scottish Professional Football League players
FK Inter Bratislava players
MŠK Žilina players
Legia Warsaw players
Everton F.C. players
PFC Krylia Sovetov Samara players
FC Arsenal Tula players
ŠK Slovan Bratislava players
Bruk-Bet Termalica Nieciecza players
Hamilton Academical F.C. players
Slovak expatriate footballers
Slovak expatriate sportspeople in Poland
Expatriate footballers in Poland
Slovak expatriate sportspeople in England
Expatriate footballers in England
Slovak expatriate sportspeople in Scotland
Expatriate footballers in Scotland
Slovak expatriate sportspeople in Russia
Expatriate footballers in Russia